Tan Xueqin is a Chinese taekwondo practitioner. 

She won a bronze medal in finweight at the 2019 World Taekwondo Championships, after being defeated by Mahla Momenzadeh in the semifinal.

References

Year of birth missing (living people)
Living people
Chinese female taekwondo practitioners
World Taekwondo Championships medalists
21st-century Chinese women